LVAC may refer to:

List Visual Arts Center, a contemporary art gallery at the Massachusetts Institute of Technology
Ventricular assist device, a medical device